WYGB (100.3 FM) is a radio station broadcasting a country music format. Licensed to Edinburgh, Indiana, the station serves the areas of Columbus, Indiana; Franklin, Indiana; Greenwood, Indiana; and Shelbyville, Indiana, and is owned by Reising Radio Partners, Inc.

Gallery

References

External links

YGB